Sankarapuram is a state assembly constituency in kallakurichi district of Tamil Nadu, India. Its State Assembly Constituency number is 79. It comprises portions of the Sankarapuram, Chinnasalem and Kallakkurichi taluks. It is a part of the Kallakurichi constituency for national elections to the Parliament of India. It is one of the 234 State Legislative Assembly Constituencies in Tamil Nadu, in India. Elections and winners in the constituency are listed below.

Demographics
Adi Dravida, Vanniyar and Sengundhar Kaikola Mudaliar were majority in this constituency. Telugu Naidu, Udayar, Chettiyar and other religious minorities constitutes secondary population.

Madras State

Tamil Nadu

Election results

2021

2016

2011

2006

2001

1996

1991

1989

1984

1980

1977

1971

1967

1962

References 

 

Assembly constituencies of Tamil Nadu
Viluppuram district